"Big Big Deal" is a song by the British singer-songwriter Steve Harley, which was released as his debut, non-album solo single in 1974. The song, which was written and produced by Harley, would be his last release before scoring the UK number one hit "Make Me Smile (Come Up and See Me)" in 1975. "Big Big Deal" also preceded the formation of the second line-up of Harley's band Cockney Rebel.

Background
"Big Big Deal" was released during the time when Harley was in the process of forming a new line-up for Cockney Rebel. The original band split at the end of an extensive UK tour in July 1974, leaving Harley without a band. Despite the setback, the band's label, EMI Records, were not dissuaded, as Harley revealed in 2014, "The people at my record label, EMI, were right behind me. They believed I could find new band members without too much of a problem and continue on to a new level of success. They believed it wasn't a major stumbling block."

While auditioning musicians and finalising a new line-up, Harley attempted to keep up the momentum of Cockney Rebel's recent commercial success by releasing a solo single. With the help of Cockney Rebel drummer Stuart Elliott, Harley recorded "Big Big Deal" at Air Studios, London in September 1974. Harley played all the instruments on the track except drums. Speaking to Record & Popswop Mirror in 1974, Harley said of the song, "It's on the lines of 'Judy Teen' and 'Mr. Soft'. Could almost be the old group [Cockney Rebel], couldn't it? First time I played it back I thought 'hey it could be the old group' and I realised a few home truths."

Once recorded, Harley took "Big Big Deal" to EMI and expressed his wishes to have it released as a single. He demanded it be released under his name only as he did not want to mislead the public. He told Record & Popswop Mirror, "I don't want anyone thinking it's my new group playing on it because it isn't." "Big Big Deal" was released as a single in November 1974, but failed to enter the UK Singles Chart. However, it did enter the unnumbered BMRB Breakers Chart on 23 November 1974, which would have been equal to a position somewhere between number 51-60 on the UK Singles Chart, at a time when the chart only ran to the top 50.

Release
"Big Big Deal" was released by EMI Records on 7-inch vinyl in the UK, Ireland, Belgium and Germany. The B-side, "Bed in the Corner", was taken from Cockney Rebel's 1974 album The Psychomodo, and was written by Harley, and produced by Harley and Alan Parsons.

Following its original release as a single, "Big Big Deal" first appeared on the 1980 EMI compilation The Best of Steve Harley and Cockney Rebel. In 1992, it appeared as a bonus track on the EMI CD re-issue of The Psychomodo. It has also appeared on 2006's The Cockney Rebel – A Steve Harley Anthology, and on 2012's Cavaliers: An Anthology 1973-1974. In addition to the single version, the Cavaliers release included the full version of "Big Big Deal", which was previously unreleased.

Promotion
On 24 October 1974, Harley performed the song, along with "Bed in the Corner", live on David Jensen's ITV show 45. The single was also promoted by an advert in the 9 November 1974 issue of Melody Maker. During October 1974, the new Cockney Rebel line-up included the song within their set-list for the three concerts they performed that month.

Critical reception
On its release, Sue Byrom of Record & Popswop Mirror felt "Big Big Deal" was not "as good" as Harley's previous material with Cockney Rebel and lacked "the force normally associated with Harley". However, she praised the song's latter section "when Harley goes into a semi la la la hook line". Andy Bone of the Sunday Sun picked the song as one his "blockbusters" during November 1974. Look-in commented, "The latest single is written, produced and performed by Steve, and the new group's not on it. It's a sign of his individuality and talent, and he's worked hard to get where he is." Stephen Thomas Erlewine of AllMusic highlighted "Big Big Deal" as a standout track on the 2012 compilation Cavaliers: An Anthology 1973-1974 by labelling it an AMG Pick Track.

Cover versions
In April 2016, a version of the song was released by Darren Hayman and the Papernut Cambridge. It was released as a double A-side 7" single, along with a cover of the Paul Jones' 1967 song "I've Been a Bad, Bad Boy".

Track listing
7-inch single
"Big Big Deal" – 4:34
"Bed in the Corner" – 3:33

Personnel
 Steve Harley – vocals
 Stuart Elliott – drums

Production
 Steve Harley – producer on "Big Big Deal" and "Bed in the Corner"
 Pete Swettenham – engineer on "Big Big Deal"
 Alan Parsons – producer on "Bed in the Corner"

References

1974 songs
1974 singles
EMI Records singles
Steve Harley songs
Songs written by Steve Harley